Gaindakot (sometimes spelled Gaidakot) is a municipality in Nawalpur District in the Lumbini Zone of southern Nepal. It became a municipality in May 2014 by merging the existing Mukundapur, Amarapuri, and Gaindakot VDCs. It was again expanded by merging Ratanpur VDC. It is situated on the shore of Narayani River in the lap of Maula Kalika temple. So this place has a great possibility of tourism development. At the time of the 2011 Nepal census, it had a population of 58,841 and 13,623 individual households according to 2011 Nepal census. Contributed in the article by Prashant Subedi (Instagram: prashanttsubedi)

Events (Mahotsav)

Gaindakot Mahotsav

First Gaindakot Mahotsav

Second Gaindakot Mahotsav

Third Gaindakot Mahotsav

Amarapuri Mahotsav

First Amarapuri Mahotsav=

Media
To promote local culture, Gaindakot has one FM radio station Vijaya FM – 101.6 MHz which is a Community radio station. MTV Mukundasen TV, the first channel of Gaindakot, is broadcast from here.

Aadarsha Samaj - Daily
First newspaper published from gaindakot. It was regional release of Aadarsha Samaj news paper from Pokhara.

Vijay FM
Vijaya Community Information & Communication Cooperative Ltd. (VICCOL) was established in 2000 in Gaindakot, Nawalparasi. It established Vijaya FM and first aired on 21 August 2004 and tuned into 101.6 MHz. Community Radio Vijaya FM is the common endeavor of peoples from different socioeconomic backgrounds (i.e. experts, community members, and professionals), non-government organizations, community forest user groups, schools, colleges, hospitals, cooperatives, temples and other social institutions.

In many aspects, this radio intends to carry out the issues and the references that are hidden in the society. Awareness rising through radio programmes, case study, reports and to provide useful information to the targeted people on socio-economic, educational, cultural, as well as healthy entertaining programmes, Community Radio has been broadcasting the programmes through multiple indigenous and local languages. It is supposed that the radio would help to bring awareness among the targeted people and empower them.

Mukundasen TV
Popularly known as MTV , it is licensed for cable transmission. Launched in 1st Bhadra in 2007, MTV is part of Mukundasen Media Pvt. Ltd., which also comprises online Radio Mukundasen and online e-paper of MTV e-magazine. The three media complement each other in news and programming.

Gaindakot - Weekly
Gaindakot Weekly newspaper was established in 2013 and became the first newspaper published from Gaindakot.

Vijay Khabar - Weekly
Vijay Khabar Weekly was established in 2014.

Radio Sanket
Radio Sanket is a radio established Gaindakot.

Gaindakot Khabar - Weekly
Gaindakot Khabar debuted in 2015.

Tourist attractions

Maula Kalika
Gaindakot is famous nationwide for Maula Kalika temple and for Maula hill hiking. Maula Kalika is popular for its 360-degree panoramic view of the entire Chitwan including Chitwan National Park on the south and Mt. Manaslu and Kaligandaki river on the north. The temple is famous for sunrise view. Many high-ranking officials of Nepal, including presidents, former kings and foreign dignitaries, have visited the temple. Dashain (Vijaya dashami or Bada Dashain) festival in Sept–October and in March–April (Chaite Dashain) are peak seasons. Maula Kalika is the symbol of Hindu goddess Kali or Kalika is associated with eternal energy, the symbol of power, harmony and new beginning. The attractive view of Narayani river and many houses can be seen from there.

Laxmi Narshimha Temple
The temple of Laxmi Narshimha is situated at the lap of Moula Hill, beside Narayani River at Gaindakot ward 1. It is dedicated to the Hindu goddess Lakshmi and Narasimha, an avatar of the god Vishnu.

British Camp
A picnic site within 10-minute walk from Laxmi Narshima Temple.

Dhodeni
Dhodeni is populated by Gurung, Magar and some Kumal tribes within few hundred houses. Dhodeni is widely popular for traditional dance and party events during festive seasons around October.

Narayani River
Kaligandaki river and Narayani River flows north, east and south of Gaindakot. Narayani river is the deepest and also one of the biggest rivers of Nepal. The Narayani Bridge over the river connects Chitwan District with Nawalparasi District of Nepal. Small islands, like Nagarban in Narayani river are popular picnic spots. Eastern side of the Narayani river bank in Gaindakot is regarded as the holy site for Hindu rituals and well as a playground for school children. For long time Narayani river had been a life-line of Gaindakot as the main source of drinking water supply irrespective of the season and water quality until the late 1990s.

A lot of people walk over Narayani Bridge for cool evening air and scenic sunset view.

Narayangadh
Narayangadh in Bharatpur city (which is not part of Gaindakot), is the main shopping and commercial area for Gaindakot residents. It is the main transit point for all the vehicles traveling via east–west Mahendra Highway and also for the people traveling from  Kathmandu, Gorkha, and Pokhara  through Mugling road. Devghat is an important religious site for elderly people of Gaindakot.

Recently, Narayangadh has become a retail and commercial capital of whole Chitwan district and Bharatpur Municipality. It is also the center for hospitality industry which includes hotels, lodges, restaurants etc. and transportation hub for Chitwan district.

One has to travel through the Narayani Bridge to connect Narayanghat and Gaindakot.

Chitwan National Park
Nearby Chitwan National Park, a World Heritage Site (also not part of Gaindakot), is home to one horn rhinoceros, elephants, royal Bengal tigers, crocodiles, deers and many other wild animals. It is the third largest tourist destination in Nepal after Kathmandu and Pokhara. Gaindakot's name is derived from the rhinoceros, as they are said to be once dominating Gaindakot plains until the mid-20th century.

Education

Literacy
More than 88% people are literate.

Schools, colleges and educators

There are several schools in this small town, educating thousands of children. A mix of government, private and community based education institutions are in operation. The academic performance is fairly high. Senior teachers are active. Besides this, a lot of students go to schools in Chitwan as well.

 Shree Janak College
 Amar English Secondary Boarding School.
 Bal Bikash English Boarding School
 Continental English Boarding School
 Gaindakot English School
 Gaindakot Namuna Secondary School
 Janak Model Secondary School
 Kalika Model Secondary School
 Lumbini ICT Campus
 Mukundasen Multiple College
 Narayani Basic School
 Oxford College of Engineering and Management
 Shree Saraswati Niketan Higher Secondary Boarding School
 Shree Pancha Jyoti Basic School
 Secret Hearts
 Shining English Boarding School
 Shree Gyankunja English Boarding School
 Shree saraswati Basic school- Gaindakot-5
 Shree Janata Secondary School Harkapur
 Shree Laxmi Higher Secondary School
 Shree Narayani Secondary School
 Shree Nepal Rashtriya Shamsher Adarsha Secondary School, Formerly Jaujuwa School
 Shree Vijaya Jyoti Basic School
 Smile Kids Pre Monteshwari
 Surya Bhakta Patana Devi Memorial College
 Suryodaya Vidya Mandir
 Trimurti Vidhaya Mandir- Gaindakot -7
 Vijaya Community Higher Secondary School

Agriculture

Gaindakot's plain land is suitable for agriculture. Rice, wheat, mustard, corn, millet, and potato are among the crops grown across the seasons in Gaindakot.

The land on the northern area of east–west national highway before the hilly area is traditionally used for farming due to the better irrigation system. Farmers and peasants in Gaindakot are reliable on monsoon season as the most efficient irrigation source.

A small irrigation dam is located on the way toward Dhodeni, north of Ranital. Farming in Gaindakot is non-dependent on modern farm equipment except tractors and is mostly conducted through "Kuto-Kodali", the traditional way of Nepali agriculture. Gaindakot is also famous for the production of Sagar Honey, nationally famous for its taste.

Health

 Kalika Institute of Technology
 Public Health Center
 Ganesh Aushadhi Sadan
 Ganesh Aushadhi Sadan is the oldest serving medical service center serving the people of Gaindakot for almost half a century now. It's based in ward no. 2 near the Bhrikuti Pulp and Paper Factory main gate. 
 Gaindakot Poly Clinic

Industry 
Gaindakot has some small scale textile industries, boring industries, metal industries, gas refilling industries, a brewery and a distillery. Dynamic Towel Industry, M G Textile are based in Gaindakot. The Bhrikuti Paper and Pulp factory has been shut down since 2011 due to financial reasons.
Chitwan Match Factory once established in the late 1980s operating from Jajua on the east of Gaindakot town has been shut down in the 1990s probably due to the shift of market demand on lighters. Below is a list of industries in Gaindakot:

Production Industries:

Kandel Rice Mill-Gaindakot-7

Brewery and Distillery
 Gorkha Brewery, Gaidakot-13
 Sumy Distillery, Gaidakot-13
Paper and Pulp
 Bhrikuti Paper and Pulp Ltd.

Gas Refilling Industries
 Gaindakot - 9

Oil Packaging Industries
 Gold Oil Packaging Gaindakot -4

Textile Industries
 Tri-Shakti Textiles
 Dynamic Textiles
 Silver Textiles
 MG Textiles
 Novaknit Textiles

 Plastic Tent Fabrication Industries
 Gaindakot -2
 Gaindakot -5

Plastic Rope Fabrication Industries
 Gaindakot - 2

Drinking Water and Beverage Industries
 Pyus Drinking and Beverage

Bakery Industries
 Gaindakot -2

Hume Pipe and Electric Poles Industries
Radha Krishna Hume Pipes and Electric Poles Gaindakot -15

Communication
The local dialing code of Gaindakot Municipality 078 which is shared from Nawalparasi District. People of Gaindakot use sim of both Ncell and Nepal Telecom of Narayani zone instead of Lumbini zone.

Transportation
Bharatpur Airport (located in Chitwan, not in Gaindakot) is located on the south of Gaindakot and is the nearest airport connecting to Kathmandu. Four domestic airlines and one government airline make 7 to 11 flights a day. Mahendra (East West) Highway connects Gaindakot to Kankarbhitta in the east to Bhimdatta (formerly Mahendranagar) in the west of the country while another highway connects Gaindakot with Kathmandu and Pokhara via Narayangadh. Bus, Micro bus and other land transportation are available for long route journey and for internal transportation taxi, rickshaw and car/jeep hiring is available from Pulchok Narayangadh, next to Narayani Gridge.

Transportation facilities within Gaindakot has developed a lot over the past few years. Now most of the roads are pitched especially the areas nearby Mahendra Highway. Large number of people use motor bikes, bicycles, few use private car. Public transportation are regularly available across the highway and from Pulchowk to Maula Kalika hill base.

The airport, a few kilometers away from Lumbini, is expected to be operational from second half of 2018 once upgrade work has been completed.

Drinking water
There are two projects that extract and process drinking water supply for households. Underground and brook water from Jay Shree Khola is used processed and supplied through different distribution channels.

The water drinking supply in Jaluke is located in Ward no. 1 which is partly open water. Gaindakot pumping scheme water supply and sanitation user organization supplies underground water in wards no. 1,2,4,5,6 and 8.

NPO/NGO
Vijaya Development Resource Centre (VDRC), initially known as Vijaya Youth Club, is a non-profit member based social development organization. It has been working in the community development sector since 1982 with a vision of equitable, peaceful, affluent and self-reliant society. VDRC is now recognized as a national level NGO with multidisciplinary human resources and good infrastructure facilities. It has successfully completed a number of community development projects across the country and has made a significant contribution in bringing positive changes through a people-centered development approach.

SAHAMATI ('consensus' in Nepali), is a non-governmental, non-political and non-profit organization established in 2001 with its headquarters in Gaindakot. It works for equitable development with community-centered approach, focusing on social justice and social transformation, human rights development and self-help promotion in cooperation with similar international organizations.

SDRC (Social Development and Research Center)

References

External links
Official Homepage of Gaindakot Municipality (Under Construction as of Sept, 2015)
Innovative Gaindakot (English/Japanese)
Gaindakot Online
Official Site of Maula Kalika Temple in Nepali Language
Gaindakot based NPO – SAHAMATI
Gaindakot News Portal
Gaindakot on Twitter
Gaindakot, Nepal on Facebook
Gaindakot Dot pCom on Facebook

Populated places in Nawalpur District
Nepal municipalities established in 2014